Eric Michael Griffin is an American heavy metal and rock guitarist. He has been the lead guitarist in the industrial metal band Genitorturers since 1999. He is most famous for playing bass in the horror punk band Murderdolls as well as guitar in both Wednesday 13 and Faster Pussycat. Eric is originally from Boston, Massachusetts where he attended Berklee College of Music and now resides in Los Angeles.

Gear
Dean Guitars 
Custom B.C. Rich Mockingbird bass guitars
Custom ESP Les Paul bass guitars
Gibson Blackbird
Marshall VBA400x2, Marshall VBA810x2

History

Music
Griffin started playing guitar at the age of 12 and states his childhood influences as KISS and Mötley Crüe. He joined his first band Synical in 1999 with his friend Ben Graves.

In 2002, Tripp Eisen showed a video of himself jamming with Griffin and Graves to Joey Jordison for a band in which he was involved while Slipknot was on hiatus; the Murderdolls. Although not his preferred position of lead guitar, Griffin agreed to join the Murderdolls as the bassist. Murderdolls had already recorded their debut album by the time Griffin had joined, although he does feature in the album artwork for "Beyond the Valley of the Murderdolls."

Griffin toured all over the world with the Murderdolls; Australia, Japan, United Kingdom, etc. and found great success with the band. He is featured in promotional videos for "Dead in Hollywood," "White Wedding," and "Love at First Fright".

In 2004, as guitarist Joey Jordison returned to his primary band Slipknot, the Murderdolls went on hiatus. Since this time, Griffin has played with a number of other bands, such as New Rising Son, Genitorturers, Wednesday 13, The Dreaming, and Faster Pussycat, as well as a brief reunion of Synical for a tribute show.

Griffin has worked with Ajax Garcia and Jesse Mendez in the band The Napoleon Blownaparts, or The Blownaparts as they are also known. However, Griffin himself claims that his involvement with The Napoleon Blownaparts has been overblown by the media, as he has only played one show with them and recorded two cover songs.  He has also filled in as guitarist for Faster Pussycat after Brent Muscat was unable to tour.

In 2006, Griffin rejoined Murderdolls frontman Wednesday 13 in 13's solo band and toured with him for a year.
As of Friday, August 3, 2007, Wednesday 13's tour page, MySpace, and  Eric's website stated that Griffin had reportedly left the Wednesday 13 tour band. No information was stated on the sites as to why he left. Griffin was replaced by J-Sin Trioxin.

In October 2007, Griffin entered The Chop Shop in Hollywood. and performed a guitar solo on Undercover Slut's "Kastration Kar Krashes" song, featured on "Amerikkka Macht Frei" (Undercover Slut's new album).

Griffin finished work on 'QUIT WHILE YOU'RE BEHIND' album/DVD to be released fall 2008. He and Ben Graves were joined by live bassist Dan Kincaid (Spit Out Star), and toured internationally.

In 2009, Griffin joined Genitorturers as the lead guitarist where he remains.

In a 2011 interview with Rock N Roll Experience Magazine, Griffin stated he was not invited to join the re-activated Murderdolls, stating "there's been debate over whether or not I was asked & whether or not I turned it down and I just want to be clear up one thing. Those 2 guys (Joey Jordison & Wednesday 13) did not invite or ask any of the members, they just did what they did and I'm not going to get into the why's or the how's or the who's, but yeah, it was their show, they didn't ask, they didn't tell...just like the military & that's the end of it."

Bands that Griffin has played in
 1999–2002  Synical- guitars
 2002–2004 Murderdolls - bass
 2004 The Napoleon Blownaparts - guitars
 2005  Faster Pussycat - guitars
 2006–2007 Wednesday 13 - guitars
 2008–2009 Synical - guitars
 2009–present Genitorturers – guitars
 2011–2012 The Dreaming – guitars
 2012–2013 Davey Suicide – guitars
 2014–2015 Six Days Til Sunday – guitars

Video
As well as featuring in videos for the Murderdolls, Wednesday 13 and Davey Suicide as a band member, Griffin has featured in a number of other promotional videos as an actor.

Depeche Mode – I Feel Loved
Alien Ant Farm –  Movies in which he played the part of Axl Rose
Static-X – Cold where he played a vampire.
Goo Goo Dolls – Broadway
Deftones – Back to School where he plays a student

Griffin also made a brief cameo appearance in the movie; Queen of the Damned.

References

External links
(Rock N Roll Experience interviews Eric Griffin!)
Look What The Zombies Dragged In From The Grave! (W13, MD, FDQ & MST Fansite)

1976 births
American rock guitarists
American male guitarists
Faster Pussycat members
Genitorturers members
Horror punk musicians
Living people
Massachusetts Republicans
Murderdolls members
Musicians from Boston
People from Boston